Hygroplasta lygaea is a moth in the family Lecithoceridae. It was described by Edward Meyrick in 1911. It is found in Kashmir and Nepal.

The wingspan is about 24 mm. The forewings are rather dark purplish bronzy fuscous with the discal stigmata rather small, cloudy and blackish. The hindwings are dark fuscous.

References

Moths described in 1911
Hygroplasta
Taxa named by Edward Meyrick